Major-General Humphrey Edgar Nicholson Bredin,  (28 March 1916 – 2 March 2005), known as Bala Bredin, was a British Army officer whose military service took him from 1930s Palestine via Dunkirk, North Africa and Italy to the Cold War in Germany.

Early life
Bredin was born at Peshawar on the North West Frontier of British India on 28 March 1916. Bredin was the second son of Lieutenant-Colonel A. Bredin, of the Indian Army. He was educated at King's School, Canterbury, and at the Royal Military College, Sandhurst. It was at Sandhurst that Bredin acquired the nickname Bala. This was the name of a fort in Peshawar as well as a racehorse owned by the Aga Khan. After graduating from Sandhurst, Bredin was commissioned into the Royal Ulster Rifles in 1936. He deployed with the regiment to Palestine where he was quartered in a village called Bala.

Military career

Palestine
During the 1936–1939 Arab revolt in Palestine Bredin was a subaltern with the 2nd Royal Ulster Rifles in Upper Galilee. The Army was charged with protecting Jewish settlements and tracking down Arab insurgents. Bredin took part in counter-insurgency with Major Orde Wingate's Special Night Squads. He was awarded the Military Cross in a clash at a notorious ambush point on the Tulkarm-Nablus road, in April 1938, and a Bar to the award a month later in a similar action. The citation recorded that, "he had already proved adept at this work which is both arduous and dangerous". He was also mentioned in dispatches for his services in Palestine.

Second World War 

Bredin participated in the Battle of France in 1940, serving with the Royal Ulster Rifles. They marched from Louvain to Dunkirk, repulsing German attacks en route, before boarding an Isle of Man steamer. While on board Bredin came across a steward and asked for a beer, to which the steward replied, "Yes, sir, but I can't serve you till we are three miles out". Bredin received his beer as they were about to land in Kent and he thought to himself, "...we can't lose the war with people like that about".

In 1944, Bredin was commanding the 6th Battalion Royal Inniskilling Fusiliers in Italy. He was tasked with breaching the Gustav Line, the German defensive position, leading the 78th Division in the engagement. A subsequent bravery citation relating to his actions of 15 May 1944 read - 

Two days later on 17 May 1944 he was ordered to attack Piumarola. Bredin was injured while on the start line for the attack but carried on with the engagement until loss of blood led to his fainting and he was evacuated. For his actions he was awarded the Distinguished Service Order.

After recovering from his wounds sustained in May, Bredin was placed in command of the 2nd Battalion, London Irish Rifles. The battalion were attached to the 9th Lancers and deployed in armoured personnel carriers known as Kangaroos. In this role they captured bridges over the Fossa Sabbiosola and reached the Scolo Bolognese. The action resulted in the over-running of enemy artillery position with guns destroyed and prisoners of war taken.

Post-war 
After the war, Bredin served in Palestine once more before a stint as an instructor at Sandhurst. He then served as with the Sudan Defence Force between 1949 and 1953.

Bredin went on to command the 2nd Parachute Regiment at Suez and on Cyprus. It was on Cyprus that Bredin won his third DSO while carrying out counter-terrorism work. His men captured large quantities of weapons and broke up four groups. He was then posted home for two years before being sent to Malaya and Borneo where he commanded 99 Gurkha Brigade Group.

In 1962, Bredin was sent to Germany as Chief of the British Commander-in-Chief's Mission to Soviet Forces in Germany (BRIXMIS). This was a position he filled for two years. From there he was moved to command 42nd (Lancashire) Division/District of the Territorial Army in 1965. He went on to be General Officer Commanding North West District in 1967. The end of the decade saw Bredin appointed Companion of the Order of the Bath (CB) in 1969. Between 1968 and 1971 Bredin served as Director of Volunteers, Territorials and Cadets, Ministry of Defence. It was also in this period that he was the first Colonel Commandant of the King's Division. Bredin was also Colonel of the Royal Irish Rangers from 1979 to 1984.

Retirement 
In retirement Bredin was the Cancer Research campaign Essex and Suffolk appeals secretary. He was also a regular correspondent in the Daily Telegraph. This was the forum where he challenged defence cuts in 1991 and questioned remarks by Field Marshal Lord Carver relating to the cavalry. Bredin said that field marshals never retire; "they had to defeat the Queen's enemies in the murky future and to harass the politicians accordingly".

Bredin said of warfare that, "I've seen too much of war to like it". However, he believed that Britain should be prepared for any event and not rely on "peace in our time".

Family
Bredin's first marriage, to Jacqueline Geare in 1947, was dissolved in 1961. He married Anne Hardie in 1961. He had one daughter from his first marriage and two daughters from his second.

References

 

|-
 

1916 births
2005 deaths
British Army major generals
British Army personnel of the Malayan Emergency
British Army personnel of World War II
British military personnel of the 1936–1939 Arab revolt in Palestine
Companions of the Distinguished Service Order
Companions of the Order of the Bath
Graduates of the Royal Military College, Sandhurst
Recipients of the Military Cross
Royal Ulster Rifles officers
Royal Inniskilling Fusiliers officers
British Parachute Regiment officers
Military personnel of British India
British military personnel of the Palestine Emergency
Academics of the Royal Military Academy Sandhurst